Najnidae is a family of crustaceans belonging to the order Amphipoda.

Genera:
 Carinonajna Bousfield & Marcoux, 2004
 Najna Derzhavin, 1937

References

Amphipoda